The National Coffee Association (NCA) or (National Coffee Association of U.S.A., Inc.), is the main market research, consumer information, and lobbying association for the coffee industry in the United States.

The association has functions and services include:
Market and scientific research
Domestic and international government relations, including lobbying
Public relations and education

History
The National Coffee Association was founded in 1911. It was the United States' first association for the US coffee industry, and it is one of the oldest trade associations formed in the country.

Membership and management
NCA's membership comprises mainly small and mid-sized companies, including coffee growers, roasters, retailers, as well as importers/exporters and wholesaler/suppliers. This membership accounts for more than 90% of all US coffee commerce.

The Chairman of the association is Michael Gaviña with F. Gaviña & Sons, Inc.

National Coffee Drinking Trends
Started in 1950, this branch of the NCA surveys coffee consumption in the United States, producing a statistical research report published annually.

"Join the Coffee Achievers"
In response to twenty years of declining coffee consumption, the association launched a $20 million "Join the Coffee Achievers" advertising campaign on September 11, 1983. Aimed at the 18-to-34 age group, the television commercials featured Ken Anderson, David Bowie, Jane Curtin, Joe Jackson, Allison Roe, Cicely Tyson, Kurt Vonnegut and Heart's Ann and Nancy Wilson, and had Electric Light Orchestra's "Hold On Tight" as the theme song. The campaign was criticized by the Center for Science in the Public Interest's Michael F. Jacobson who targeted statements about coffee providing "serenity and contentment" as being incorrect and misleading.

Coffee Achievers was mentioned in the 1985 Weird Al Yankovic song "Dare to Be Stupid" and the 1989 Bad Religion song "Anxiety." In the 1993 LucasArts adventure game Sam & Max Hit the Road, the character Max mentions he's also a coffee achiever during various conversations.

See also

 Economics of coffee
 International Coffee Agreement
 :Category:Coffee organizations

References

External links
Website
Coffee &: Me http://www.coffeeandme.org/ A science-based resource on coffee, caffeine, and health -- a service of the National Coffee Association

Coffee organizations
Lobbying organizations in the United States
Organizations established in 1911
Agricultural organizations based in the United States
Coffee in the United States
1911 establishments in the United States